Emil Angelov (born on 17 July 1980 in Haskovo) is a former Bulgarian footballer who played as a forward.

Career 
His career began at Svilengrad, having played for Haskovo as a youth. In 2001 Angelov joined Chernomorets Burgas. In his two and a half-year stint with the team, he played 55 games scoring 18 goals in the Bulgarian A PFG.

Levski Sofia 
Angelov joined Levski Sofia on 24 January 2004 on a four-year contract for a transfer fee of €140,000. He made his league debut for Levski on 14 February and scored his first goal in the process, netting Levski's third of a 3–0 victory over Chernomorets Burgas.

Angelov scored his first-ever European goal on 12 August 2004, in a 5–0 home win over Modriča in their UEFA Cup second qualifying round first leg tie.

Litex Lovech 
On 8 January 2008 Angelov was bought by Litex Lovech. He made his debut for Litex on 18 January 2008 in a friendly match against Al-Karamah which ended in a draw. Angelov played during the second half of the match.

His first goal for Litex was on 13 February 2008 against JEF United Ichihara Chiba. He scored it in 85th minute. The result of the match was 2:1 win for Litex.

Emil Angelov made his official debut for Litex on 1 March 2008 against CSKA Sofia. The result of the match was 0:0 with a guest draw for Litex.

Denizlispor 
In 2009, he signed with Süper Lig club Denizlispor.

Karabükspor 
In 2010, he signed with Süper Lig club Karabükspor.

Anorthosis 
On 10 July 2011, Angelov signed for Cypriot First Division side Anorthosis Famagusta on a one-year deal. Few hours later, he made his first appearance for Anorthosis in a 2–0 friendly win over Lokomotiv Plovdiv. Angelov made his competitive debut on 28 July, in a 0–2 home loss against Rabotnički Skopje in the third qualifying round of the Europa League, coming on as a substitute for Ricardo Laborde.

Haskovo 
In 2013, Angelov joined his hometown club Haskovo. He announced his retirement from football in January 2015 and joined the coaching staff, becoming assistant to Emil Velev.

International career
On 1 March 2006, Angelov made his debut for Bulgaria in the friendly match against Macedonia.

Honours
Levski Sofia
 Bulgarian A PFG – 2006, 2007
 Bulgarian Cup – 2005, 2007
 Bulgarian Supercup – 2005, 2007

Litex Lovech
 Bulgarian Cup - 2009

Beroe Stara Zagora
 Bulgarian Cup - 2013
 Bulgarian Supercup - 2013

Career statistics
(Correct as of 31 October 2012)

References

External links
 
 
  Official player website from LEVSKI2000

 Profile at Levskisofia.info

1980 births
Living people
Bulgarian footballers
Bulgaria international footballers
Bulgarian expatriate footballers
FC Chernomorets Burgas players
PFC Levski Sofia players
PFC Litex Lovech players
Denizlispor footballers
Kardemir Karabükspor footballers
Konyaspor footballers
PFC Beroe Stara Zagora players
FC Haskovo players
First Professional Football League (Bulgaria) players
Second Professional Football League (Bulgaria) players
Süper Lig players
Expatriate footballers in Turkey
Expatriate footballers in Cyprus
Association football forwards
People from Haskovo
Sportspeople from Haskovo Province